Entertainment Film Distributors, Ltd. is a British distributor of independent films in the UK and Ireland for various production companies, founded by Michael L. Green and currently run by his son Nigel Green.

Michael L. Green was a veteran producer/distributor involved in the film industry since the 1930s when he was a teenager. In 1972, he formed Variety the prolific film distributor. In 1978, Green closed Variety and with his two sons Nigel and Trevor formed Entertainment Film Distributors (and later its video arm Entertainment in Video), and was one of the leading forces in UK distribution. Michael L. Green died on 17 June 2003 aged 84 and Trevor Green died on 30 April 2020 aged 66.

Their first big success was Teen Wolf (1985) starring Michael J. Fox. Entertainment also released films for Empire Pictures and New World Pictures.

Most notably, between 1990 and 2010, Entertainment distributed films made by New Line Cinema along with films from other independent production companies. One of the most notable series of films distributed to date is The Lord of the Rings trilogy. Beginning in 2008, Entertainment Film Distributors became The Weinstein Company's main United Kingdom distributor up until 2017, when the Harvey Weinstein scandal began. In 2010, distribution rights for New Line Cinema films in the UK and Ireland were folded into New Line's parent company Warner Bros. Entertainment Film Distributors have released many BAFTA- and Oscar-winning films including The Departed, Million Dollar Baby, Gosford Park, Brokeback Mountain, The Artist and Everything Everywhere All At Once.

Film releases
List of films distributed include:

1951:
 Wild Women

1971:
 A Boy Named Charlie Brown

1975:
 Flesh Gordon

1976:
 If You Don't Stop It... You'll Go Blind

1977:
 Black Samurai
 Desperate Living

1978:
 Terror
 The Inglorious Bastards
 What's Up Superdoc!
 The Buddy Holly Story
 The Mountain of the Cannibal God
 Barracuda

1979:
 Gambling City
 The Van
 Immoral Women
 Spree
 Malibu Beach

1980:
 Tarzoon: Shame of the Jungle
 Dracula Sucks

1981:
 Polyester
 The Prowler

1982:
 Island of Blood
 Tuxedo Warrior
 Day of the Animals
 Parasite
 Waitress!

1983:
 Little Laura and Big John
 Starstruck
 Hysterical
 Zapped!
 The New Barbarians
 S.A.S. à San Salvador
 Funny Money

1984:
 Hot Dog…The Movie
 Thunder Warrior
 Deadly Force
 Real Life
 Mutant
 A Matter of Time
 The King and the Mockingbird
 The Party Animal
 The Dungeonmaster
 Ghost Warrior
 Code Name: Wild Geese
 Trancers
 The Act

1985:
 1990: The Bronx Warriors
 Alphabet City
 Ghoulies
 Future-Kill
 Starchaser: The Legend of Orin
 Re-Animator
 Night of the Comet
 Teen Wolf
 Savage Island
 Commando Leopard
 The Adventures of Mark Twain
 Octavia
 Zone Troopers

1986:
 House
 Troll
 The Adventures of the American Rabbit
 Eliminators
 Soldier's Revenge
 Godzilla 1985
 GoBots: Battle of the Rock Lords
 TerrorVision
 Deadtime Stories
 No Retreat, No Surrender
 Jake Speed
 Rainbow Brite and the Star Stealer
 Operation Nam
 The Falling
 Extremities
 The Men's Club
 Necropolis
 Sky Bandits
 Joysticks

1987:
 Ricky 1
 Armed Response
 The Kindred
 Day of the Dead
 Little Shop of Horrors
 The Big Bang
 Modern Girls
 Destination America
 Wanted: Dead or Alive
 Mutant Hunt
 Enemy Territory
 Cyclone
 Hellraiser
 Near Dark
 Ghoulies II
 It Couldn't Happen Here
 No Retreat, No Surrender 2
 Flowers in the Attic
 Creepshow 2
 Prison
 Vamp

1988:
 Mama Dracula
 Breeders
 Cop
 A Tiger's Tale
 Cellar Dweller
 The Commander
 Ghost Town
 Catacombs
 Rock & Rule
 Buy & Cell

1989:
 Deep Space
 Survival Game
 The Lone Runner
 Slipstream
 Kansas
 Sonny Boy
 I, Madman
 Teen Witch
 1969
 Curse II: The Bite
 The Curse
 Night Game
 Kickboxer
 The Return of the Musketeers
 Major League
 Puppet Master
 Arena
 Interzone
 The Wolves of Willoughby Chase

1990:
 Three Wishes
 Wired
 Buried Alive
 Shadowzone
 China O'Brien
 Clownhouse
 Best of the Best
 Cat Chaser
 Palais Royale
 Honeymoon Academy
 Meridian: Kiss of the Beast
 Night of the Cyclone
 Crash and Burn
 Creator
 Hope and Glory
 Dark Angel
 The Reflecting Skin
 Wild Orchid
 Pump Up the Volume
 The Garbage Pail Kids Movie
 The Lemon Sisters
 Why Me?
 Nightbreed
 Bad Influence
 Killer Instinct
 Puppet Master II
 Street Hunter
 Warm Summer Rain

1991:
 The Pit and the Pendulum
 Kickboxer 2: The Road Back
 Men at Work
 The Adventures of Lolo the Penguin
 Highlander II: The Quickening
 The Ambulance
 Wedlock
 Martial Law
 Cool Blue
 Mom
 Subspecies
 The Nutcracker Prince
 Twenty-One
 Trancers II
 Karate Cop

1992:
 Riding the Edge
 By the Sword
 Suburban Commando
 Once Upon a Crime
 Demonic Toys
 Armour of God II: Operation Condor
 Kuffs
 Dollman
 Meet the Feebles
 At Play in the Fields of the Lord
 Think Big
 Until the End of the World
 Live Wire
 Split Second
 Freddie as F.R.O.7
 Jersey Girl
 The Princess and the Goblin
 Peter's Friends
 Into the West
 Traces of Red

1993:
 Delta Heat
 Sidekicks
 Damage
 Sniper
 Stalingrad
 Mr. Nanny
 Best of the Best II
 Ruby Cairo
 Surf Ninjas
 Excessive Force
 Shadow of the Wolf
 Boxing Helena
 Jailbait
 Super Mario Bros.
 Much Ado About Nothing
 The Piano
 American Heart
 Slaughter of the Innocents
 Weekend at Bernie's II

1994:
 The Knife
 Hear No Evil
 Joshua Tree
 The Man Without a Face
 Tombstone
 Arcade
 Save Me
 Where the Rivers Flow North
 The House of the Spirits
 Against the Wall
 The Hit List
 Tom & Viv
 What's Eating Gilbert Grape
 The Crow
 Solar Crisis
 Staggered
 Roadflower
 Sugar Hill
 Watch It
 Airborne
 Once Were Warriors
 The Mask
 Bad Boy Bubby
 Monkey Trouble
 Rapa Nui
 Highlander III: The Sorcerer
 The Mighty Ducks
 A Feast at Midnight
 Princess Caraboo
 Solitaire for 2

1995:
 Shrunken Heads
 Father and Scout
 Men of War
 The Road to Wellville
 Immortal Beloved
 Once Were Warriors
 Fresh
 Don Juan DeMarco
 Death Machine
 Bank Robber
 The Maddening
 Surviving the Game
 Haunted
 In the Mouth of Madness
 Friday
 The City of Lost Children
 Mortal Kombat
 Living in Oblivion
 The Scarlet Letter
 Mad Dogs and Englishmen

1996:
 The Mask: Animated Series
 No Exit
 Se7en
 Leaving Las Vegas
 Midnight Heat
 Bed of Roses
 Nixon
 Police Story 4: First Strike aka (Jackie Chan's First Strike)
 Angus
 Up Close and Personal
 A Thin Line Between Love and Hate
 Kingpin
 The Substitute
 Castle Freak
 Theodore Rex
 Last Man Standing
 The Long Kiss Goodnight
 2 Days in the Valley
 The Fan
 Evita
 Space Truckers
 The Island of Dr. Moreau
 Feeling Minnesota
 Twelfth Night
 Hard Men

1997:
 The Arrival
 Mother Night
 The Evening Star
 Head of the Family
 Coyote Run
 Turbulence
 It Takes Two
 First Strike
 Shadow Conspiracy
 Shooting Fish
 Seven Years in Tibet
 Private Parts
 Vampire Journals
 Dangerous Ground
 Donnie Brasco
 Boogie Nights
 Gummo
 An American Werewolf in Paris
 Love Jones
 Trial and Error
 Preaching to the Perverted
 Spawn
 One Night Stand
 Photographing Fairies
 I Know What You Did Last Summer
 Pink Flamingos (1997 re-release)
 B.A.P.S.

1998:
 Rush Hour
 Wag the Dog
 Money Talks
 Wild Things
 Star Kid
 Dark City
 The Wedding Singer
 Lost in Space
 The Wisdom of Crocodiles
 Desperate Measures
 Up 'n' Under
 Deep Rising
 Blade
 How the Toys Saved Christmas
 All the Little Animals

1999:
 Pleasantville
 American History X
 Blast from the Past
 Happiness
 The Corruptor
 You're Dead...
 Mad Cows
 This Year's Love
 Ride with the Devil
 Austin Powers: The Spy Who Shagged Me
 Swing
 Detroit Rock City
 The Trench
 The Muse
 The Legend of 1900

2000:
 Rancid Aluminium
 Love & Basketball
 Final Destination
 Leif Erickson, Discoverer of North America
 Complicity
 Dungeons & Dragons
 U-571
 Little Nicky
 Bring It On
 Lost Souls
 Next Friday
 The Cell
 The Luzhin Defence
 Traffic
 American Psycho
 Cherry Falls
 The Family Man

2001:
 A Nightmare on Elm Street 2: Freddy's Revenge
 A Nightmare on Elm Street 4: The Dream Master
 Monster's Ball
 15 Minutes
 Bamboozled
 Town & Country
 The Anniversary Party
 Spy Game
 Gosford Park
 Blow
 Hedwig and the Angry Inch
 One Night at McCool's
 The Man Who Wasn't There
 Rush Hour 2
 Storytelling
 The Prime Gig
 The Safety of Objects
 Ali
 The Lord of the Rings: The Fellowship of the Ring
 Mike Bassett: England Manager

2002:
 Life as a House
 John Q.
 Austin Powers in Goldmember
 Ripley's Game
 About Schmidt
 Far from Heaven
 Unconditional Love
 Before You Go
 Jason X
 Friday After Next
 S1m0ne
 The Lord of the Rings: The Two Towers
 The Emperor's Club
 The Reckoning
 My Big Fat Greek Wedding
 Boat Trip
 Blade II

2003:
 Final Destination 2
 Poolhall Junkies
 Sonny
 A Man Apart
 Knockaround Guys
 Freddy vs. Jason
 Gangs of New York
 Underworld
 The Texas Chainsaw Massacre
 Elf
 The Reckoning
 Timeline
 The Lord of the Rings: The Return of the King

2004:
 Leatherface: The Texas Chainsaw Massacre III
 Deep Cover
 Nick Jr.'s Play Along
 The Sleeping Dictionary
 Saw
 Million Dollar Baby
 Fat Slags
 Charlie
 Beyond the Sea
 After the Sunset
 Boo, Zino & the Snurks
 Birth
 Ladies in Lavender
 Cellular
 In Good Company
 Blade: Trinity
 Around the World in 80 Days
 The Phantom of the Opera
 Dawn of the Dead
 The Notebook
 Hotel Rwanda

2005:
 Critters
 Critters 2: The Main Course
 Critters 3
 Critters 4
 Million Dollar Baby
 Serenity
 The Mistress of Spices
 Son of the Mask
 Lassie
 The Cave
 Keeping Mum
 The Long Weekend
 Saw II
 White Noise
 Wedding Crashers
 Valiant
 Brokeback Mountain
 Domino
 Assault on Precinct 13
 Hostage
 Mike Bassett: Manager
 Dreamer
 Lassie

2006:
 Snakes on a Plane
 The Black Dahlia
 Final Destination 3
 Running Scared
 Hoot
 Basic Instinct 2
 Underworld: Evolution
 The Nativity Story
 Lucky Number Slevin
 16 Blocks
 Blade: The Series
 Stormbreaker
 Fur
 Little Children
 The Departed
 Tenacious D in The Pick of Destiny

2007:
 The Texas Chainsaw Massacre: The Beginning
 How to Eat Fried Worms
 White Noise 2: The Light
 Blood and Chocolate
 Because I Said So
 The Number 23
 Premonition
 The Last Mimzy
 Fracture
 The Alibi
 Next
 Goya's Ghosts
 Hairspray
 Lonely Hearts
 Rush Hour 3
 Death Sentence
 Run Fatboy Run
 Shoot 'Em Up
 Mr. Woodcock
 Feast of Love
 Rendition
 Silk
 August Rush
 Martian Child
 The Golden Compass
 Code Name: The Cleaner
 St. Trinian's

2008:
 Before the Devil Knows You're Dead
 Over Her Dead Body
 Semi-Pro
 The Reader
 Pathology
 Deception
 Harold & Kumar Escape from Guantanamo Bay
 Sex and the City
 My Sassy Girl
 Journey to the Center of the Earth
 Space Chimps
 Elegy
 Bangkok Dangerous
 The Women
 Appaloosa
 City of Ember
 The Mutant Chronicles
 Pride and Glory
 Zack and Miri Make a Porno
 Four Christmases
 Inkheart

2009:
 Underworld: Rise of the Lycans
 17 Again
 Menace II Society
 The Final Destination
 Fame
 The Time Traveler's Wife
 My Sister's Keeper
 He's Just Not That Into You
 Crossing Over
 Beyond a Reasonable Doubt
 Ghosts of Girlfriends Past
 The Fourth Kind
 The Tournament
 Planet 51
 Halloween II
 Gamer
 Solomon Kane
 Nine
 St Trinian's 2: The Legend of Fritton's Gold

2010:
 The New World
 The Book of Eli
 Sex & Drugs & Rock & Roll
 I Hate Valentine's Day
 Hachiko: A Dog's Story
 Space Chimps 2: Zartog Strikes Back
 Burke & Hare
 Rare Exports: A Christmas Tale
 Wild Target
 Shanghai
 Space Dogs
 Piranha 3D
 London Boulevard
 The Warrior's Way
 Animals United
 Arthur and the Great Adventure

2011:
 Something Borrowed
 The Lincoln Lawyer
 A Little Bit of Heaven
 Hugo
 Anonymous
 Scream 4
 The Artist
 The Rum Diary
 Colombiana
 Spy Kids: All the Time in the World
 My Week with Marilyn
 The Inbetweeners Movie (theatrical release only)
 Shark Night
 Apollo 18
 Killer Elite
 Texas Killing Fields
 The Lady
 I Don't Know How She Does It
 Freddy Frogface

2012:
 The Prodigies
 The Grey
 Underworld: Awakening
 One for the Money
 Gone
 Piranha 3DD
 Killing Them Softly
 Dredd
 The Intouchables
 Silver Linings Playbook
 Love Bite

2013:
 The Master
 Beautiful Creatures
 The Host
 Scary Movie 5
 Stand Up Guys
 Chasing Mavericks
 The Butler
 American Hustle
 Romeo & Juliet
 Escape from Planet Earth
 Sunshine on Leith
 The Harry Hill Movie

2014:
 August: Osage County
 I, Frankenstein
 Her
 Transcendence
 Devil's Knot
 Seve: The Movie
 The Inbetweeners 2
 The Necessary Death of Charlie Countryman
 St. Vincent
 Big Eyes

2015:
 Ribbit
 The Age of Adaline
 Knock Knock
 Space Dogs 2
 Self/less
 Southpaw
 The Bad Education Movie
 American Ultra
 Solace
 Burnt
 The Dressmaker
 The Hateful Eight

2016:
 Mike Bassett: Interim Manager
 The Boy
 Hardcore Henry
 Bad Moms
 American Pastoral

2017:
 The Bye Bye Man
 Lion
 The Space Between Us
 Colossal
 Overdrive
 A Bad Moms Christmas

2018:
 Hostiles
 12 Strong
 Status Update
 Duck Duck Goose
 Hereditary
 The Festival
 Tulip Fever

2019:
 Fisherman's Friends
 The Corrupted
 The Farewell
 Midsommar
 The Current War

2020:
 The Gentlemen
 Brahms: The Boy II

2021:
 C'mon C'mon
 The Green Knight

2022:
 Moonfall
 Dog
 X
 Everything Everywhere All at Once
 Men
 Fisherman's Friends: One and All
 Three Thousand Years of Longing

2023:
 The Crow (UK only)

TBA:
 Seize Them!
 The Inferno
 St Trinian's 3: Battle of the Sexes
 Blacksmith
 Unbound Captives

References

Film distributors of the United Kingdom